Cees Toet (born 26 September 1987) is a Dutch footballer who plays as a centre back for IJsselmeervogels in the Dutch Topklasse. Born in The Hague, he formerly played in the Eredivisie for Sparta Rotterdam, and the Eerste Divisie for RBC Roosendaal and Almere City  He is known as a hard defender who scores relatively often.

References

External links
 Voetbal International profile 

1987 births
Living people
Footballers from The Hague
Dutch footballers
Association football defenders
Sparta Rotterdam players
RBC Roosendaal players
Almere City FC players
Eredivisie players
Eerste Divisie players
Derde Divisie players